Brotula barbata, commonly known as the goatsbeard brotula, is a species of cusk-eel in the genus Brotula. It lives in the Indo-Pacific, in depths of up to 300 meters. It is dark brown with a submarginal black band and narrow white border on the dorsal and anal fins versus greenish to orange brown with orange-bordered dorsal and anal fins, and it grows up to be around 100 centimeters. It has a carnivorous diet, and it is oviparous.

References 

Ophidiidae
Fish described in 1846